Alejandro "Alex" Meraz (born January 10, 1985) is an American actor. He is best known for playing the werewolf named Paul Lahote in the film New Moon.

Life and career
Meraz was born in Mesa, Arizona and is of Purépecha descent. He attended the New School for the Arts, and is an avid painter and illustrator. Besides break-dancing, which he was active in during the early 2000s under the name "Nomak," Alex excels in indigenous and contemporary dancing. He has studied mixed martial arts, winning numerous tournaments in karate and the martial art of Capoeira. Alex's first big film was The New World as one of the Powhatan core warriors, inspiring him to continue acting. Thereafter he was in the running for the film Apocalypto but in the end was turned down. His big break came when he was cast as werewolf Paul Lahote in the film New Moon.

He also starred in the latest season of CSI: New York. Meraz played a Seal Team member in the 2016 action film Suicide Squad.

On December 31, 2007, he married Kim. A Twilight fan, she suggested that he audition for New Moon, believing he was perfect for the part. They have a son, for whom his mentor, actor Raoul Trujillo, is the godfather. In June 2012 the couple had another son.

Filmography

References

External links

 
Alex Meraz's official Twitter account

1985 births
American male dancers
American male film actors
American male karateka
American capoeira practitioners
Living people
American male actors of Mexican descent
American people of Purépecha descent
People from Mesa, Arizona
Male actors from Arizona
Hispanic and Latino American male actors